Daniel Dougal MC, Croix de Guerre, FRCOG (1884-1948) was a gynaecologist at the Manchester Royal Infirmary, the Northern Hospital for Women and Children and also St Mary's Hospital. During the First World War he served as an officer with the Royal Army Medical Corps and was awarded the Military Cross, the Croix de Guerre, and was mentioned in despatches. He was a founding fellow of the Royal College of Obstetricians and Gynaecologists.

References

External links
Daniel Dougal Diaries, University of Manchester Library, University of Manchester

1884 births
1948 deaths
Physicians of the Manchester Royal Infirmary
Recipients of the Military Cross
British Army personnel of World War I
Royal Army Medical Corps officers
Recipients of the Croix de Guerre 1914–1918 (France)
Fellows of the Royal College of Obstetricians and Gynaecologists
British gynaecologists